The Puducherry–Kanniyakumari Weekly Express is an Express train belonging to Southern Railway zone that runs between  and  in India. It is currently being operated with 16861/16862 train numbers on a weekly basis. It is the first express train that ran on the gauge converted route of Manamadurai–Virudhunagar line. Later Silambu Express extended from Karaikudi Junction via this route till .

Service

The 16861/Puducherry–Kanniyakumari Weekly Express has an average speed of 45 km/hr and covers 700 km in 15h 30m. The 16862/Kanniyakumari–Puducherry Weekly Express has an average speed of 45 km/hr and covers 700 km in 15h 30m.

Routes and major halts 
 
 
 Viluppuram
 Cuddalore
 Chidambaram
 Mayiladuthurai
 Kumbakonam
 
 
 
Karaikudi
 
 
 
 
 
 
 Tirunelveli
 Nagercoil
 Kaniyakumari

See also 

 Puducherry railway station
 Kanniyakumari railway station

References

External links 

 16861/Puducherry–Kanniyakumari Weekly Express India Rail Info
 16862/Kanniyakumari–Puducherry Weekly Express India Rail Info

Transport in Puducherry
Transport in Kanyakumari
Express trains in India
Rail transport in Tamil Nadu
Rail transport in Puducherry
Railway services introduced in 2013